Listed below are the 2004 UCI Women's Teams that competed in 2004 women's road cycling events organized by the International Cycling Union (UCI).

Teams overview

Source:

Cyclists

Team T-Mobile Women
Ages as of 1 January 2004.

Source

References

2004
UCI